Bob Rodrigo (born c. 1936) is a former American football player and coach. He served as the head football coach at California State University, Hayward—now known as California State University, East Bay—from 1971 to 1974, compiling a record of 15–23–1.

Rodrigo attended Vallejo High School in Vallejo, California and played college football at San Francisco State University, where he starred as a fullback from 1954 to 1957, twice earning Little All-America honors. After graduating from San Francisco State, he remained at the school to coach the junior varsity teams in football, basketball, and baseball, and teach physical education. In 1960, Rodrigo became an assistant football coach at Clayton Valley High School in Concord, California under head football coach Pat Murphy. Rodrigo returned to San Francisco State in 1961 as backfield coach under newly-appointed head football coach Vic Rowen. Rodrigo moved on to Cal State Hayward in 1968 to serve as an assistant football coach under Les Davis. He succeeded Davis as head coach in February 1971 when Davis left for New Mexico Highlands University.

Head coaching record

References

1930s births
Living people
American football fullbacks
Cal State Hayward Pioneers football coaches
San Francisco State Gators baseball coaches
San Francisco State Gators football coaches
San Francisco State Gators football players
San Francisco State Gators men's basketball coaches
High school football coaches in California
Sportspeople from Vallejo, California
Coaches of American football from California
Players of American football from California
Baseball coaches from California
Basketball coaches from California